Burdell is a suburb of Townsville in the City of Townsville, Queensland, Australia. In the  Burdell had a population of 5,814 people.

Geography 
The suburb is bounded to the east and north-east by the Bohle River and to north-west and north by Stony Creek which becomes a tributary of Bohle River where they met on the suburb's boundary.

The suburb is bounded to the south by the Bruce Highway and North Coast railway line with Nightjar railway station within the suburb.

The land use is suburban housing in the south of the suburb. There is grazing on native vegetation in the west of the locality. The northern part of the suburb is marshland. Other parts of the suburbs are currently unused.

History
Bohlevale State School opened on 20 November 1911.

St Clare's Catholic Primary School opened on 24 January 2011 with an initial enrolment of 177 students.

Townsville Grammar School opened its North Shore campus in Burdell in 2015.

In the  Burdell had a population of 5,814 people.

North Shore State School opened on 1 January 2018.

Education

Bohlevale State School is a government primary (Early Childhood-6) school for boys and girls at Bohlevale School Road. In 2018, the school had an enrolment of 796 students with 61 teachers (58 full-time equivalent) and 32 non-teaching staff (21 full-time equivalent). It includes a special education program.

North Shore State School is a government primary (Prep-6) school for boys and girls at Langford Street. In 2018, the school had an enrolment of 294 students with 24 teachers and 16 non-teaching staff (13 full-time equivalent). It includes a special education program.

St Clare's Catholic School is a Catholic primary (Prep-6) school for boys and girls at Burdell Drive. In 2018, the school had an enrolment of 672 students with 44 teachers (38 full-time equivalent) and 37 non-teaching staff (24 full-time equivalent).

The North Shore Campus of Townsville Grammar School is a private primary (Pre Prep-6) school on the corner of Erskine Place and North Shore Boulevard.

There is no secondary school in Burdell. The nearest government secondary school is Northern Beaches State High School in neighbouring Deeragun to the south-west.

Amenities
There are a number of parks in the suburb, including:

 Beau Park Drive Park
 Pine Meadows Park

References

External links